Lior Bela Etter (born 21 January 1990) is a Swiss football midfielder who played for FC Lucerne in the Swiss Super League until 2010.

External links 
 FCL Profile 
 Profile at Wasser für Wasser

References

1990 births
Living people
Swiss men's footballers
FC Luzern players
Association football midfielders